Stepping Out is a 1919 American silent drama film directed by Fred Niblo. It is not known whether the film currently survives, suggesting that it may be a lost film.

Cast
 Enid Bennett as The Wife
 Niles Welch as The Husband
 Julia Faye as The Secretary
 Gertrude Claire as The Husband's Mother
 William Conklin as Frank Wilson (as William S. Conklin)
 Bota Miller as Robert Hillary Jr.

References

External links

1919 films
American silent feature films
American black-and-white films
1919 drama films
Films directed by Fred Niblo
Silent American drama films
Paramount Pictures films
1910s American films
1910s English-language films